Luciano Bruno (born 23 May 1963 in Foggia) is a retired Italian boxer, who won a Welterweight Bronze medal at the 1984 Summer Olympics.

Amateur career

Olympic results
1/16: 1st round bye
1/8: Defeated Georges Bosco (Benin) 5–0
1/4: Defeated Peter Okumu (Nigeria) 4–1
1/2: Defeated Alexander Künzler (West Germany) 5–0
Finals: Lost to Mark Breland (United States) 0–5

Professional career
Bruno turned pro in 1984, winning his first nine fights, and retiring unbeaten in 1987 with a career record of 9–0–0.

Professional boxing record

Retirement and later years
Bruno is now working as a boxing coach in Foggia.

References 
 

1963 births
Living people
Sportspeople from Foggia
Boxers at the 1984 Summer Olympics
Olympic boxers of Italy
Welterweight boxers
Olympic bronze medalists for Italy
Olympic medalists in boxing
Italian male boxers
Medalists at the 1984 Summer Olympics
Mediterranean Games silver medalists for Italy
Mediterranean Games medalists in boxing
Competitors at the 1983 Mediterranean Games